Muzha/Mucha was a district in Taipei City, Taiwan. The name refers to wooden fences built in the region to defend against attacks by Taiwanese aborigines. In 1990, it merged with Jingmei District and become eastern parts of new created Wenshan District.

During Qing rule, the area belonged to Tamsui Ting.

After World War II, Muzha and Jingmei became districts of Taipei City.

Landmarks 
 Taipei Zoo
 National Chengchi University
 Shih Hsin University
 Jingmei Girls' Senior High School (景美女中), located within Muzha
 Maokong: Main area for Wenshan Paochung tea, produced in Taipei City.
 Chi Nan Temple
Beautistyle Inc.

See also
 Wenshan District

External links 
Information 

1990 disestablishments in Taiwan
Districts of Taipei
Former districts of Taiwan
History of Taipei